Anjani Kumar Sharma was Nepal's first surgeon. Sharma was born on June 7, 1928, in the remote region of Bhaluwahi in Siraha District in the Terai region of Nepal. Growing up in rural Nepal there was poor access to healthcare, because of this he lost his mother at age 8. Following her death he was inspired to become a doctor. With the help of his father and uncle he achieved his dreams. He completed his MBBS from Calcutta Medical College in 1955. He was awarded MS in Surgery from Darbhanga Medical College in India. He also went on to complete his FRCS from the UK. He is credited with establishing the Surgery Department at Bir Hospital, Nepal's oldest hospital.

Sharma also established Bhaktapur Cancer Hospital. He has also chaired Nepal Medical Association (NMA). He was one of the 5 founding members of Nepal Medical College in Jorpati. He established "Anjani Kumar Sharma Gold Medal" in 2009 which is awarded to the student securing highest marks in Surgery in final MBBS exams.

He died on October 7, 2014, in Kathmandu, suffering from transitional cell carcinoma.

References

External links
 Nepal Medical College

2014 deaths
1928 births
Nepalese surgeons